Another World is a 2021 French drama film directed by Stéphane Brizé. It was selected to compete for the Golden Lion at the 78th Venice International Film Festival.

Synopsis
"An executive manager, his wife and his family, at the point when his professional choices are about to overturn all their lives. Philippe Lemesle and his wife are separating, their love irretrievably damaged by pressures of work. A successful executive in industrial conglomerate, Philippe no longer knows how to respond to the contradictory demands of his bosses. Yesterday they wanted a manager, today an enforcer. Now he must decide what his life really means."

Cast
 Anthony Bajon as Lucas Lemesle
 Marie Drucker as Claire Bonnet-Guérin
 Sandrine Kiberlain as Anne Lemesle
 Vincent Lindon as Philippe Lemesle

Release
The film premièred at the 78th Venice International Film Festival on 10 September 2021. It was first theatrically released in Spain on 13 May 2022.

Reception

Box office
Another World grossed $0 in the United States and Canada, and a worldwide total of $2.8 million.

Critical response
On review aggregator Rotten Tomatoes, the film holds an approval rating of 100% based on 9 reviews, with an average rating of 7.5/10. On Metacritic, it holds a score of 79 out of 100, based on 5 critics, indicating "generally favorable reviews".

References

External links
 

2021 films
2021 drama films
2020s French-language films
French drama films
Films directed by Stéphane Brizé
2020s French films